This is a list of township-level divisions of the province of Hunan, China.

Changsha City

Furong District

Tianxin District

Yuelu District

Kaifu District

Yuhua District

Wangcheng District

Changsha County

Ningxiang City

Liuyang City

Zhuzhou City

Hetang District

Lusong District

Shifeng District

Tianyuan District

Liling City

Chaling County

Yanling County

You County

Lukou District

Xiangtan City

Yuetang District

Yuhu District

Shaoshan City

Xiangxiang City

Xiangtan County

Hengyang City

Nanyue District

Shigu District

Yanfeng District

Zhengxiang District

Zhuhui District

Changning City

Leiyang City

Hengdong County

Hengnan County

Hengshan County

Hengyang County

Qidong County

Shaoyang City

Beita District

Daxiang District

Shuangqing District

Wugang City

Chengbu County

Dongkou County

Longhui County

Shaodong County

Shaoyang County

Suining County

Xinning County

Xinshao County

Yueyang City

Junshan District

Yueyanglou District

Yunxi District

Linxiang City

Miluo City

Huarong County

Pingjiang County

Xiangyin County

Yueyang County

Changde City

Dingcheng District

Wuling District

Jinshi City

Anxiang County

Hanshou County

Li County

Linli County

Shimen County

Taoyuan County

Zhangjiajie City

Wulingyuan District

Yongding District

Cili County

Sangzhi County

Yiyang City

Heshan District

Ziyang District

Yuanjiang City

Anhua County

Nan County

Taojiang County

Chenzhou City

Beihu District

Suxian District

Zixing City

Anren County

Guidong County

Guiyang County

Jiahe County

Linwu County

Rucheng County

Yizhang County

Yongxing County

Yongzhou City

Lengshuitan District

Lingling District

Dao County

Dong'an County

Jianghua County

Jiangyong County

Lanshan County

Ningyuan County

Qiyang County

Shuangpai County

Xintian County

Huaihua City

Hecheng District

Hongjiang City

Chenxi County

Huitong County

Jingzhou County

Mayang County

Tongdao County

Xinhuang County

Xupu County

Yuanling County

Zhijiang County

Zhongfang County

Loudi City

Louxing District

Lengshuijiang City

Lianyuan City

Shuangfeng County

Xinhua County

Xiangxi Tujia and Miao Autonomous Prefecture

Jishou City

Baojing County

Fenghuang County

Guzhang County

Huayuan County

Longshan County

Luxi County

Yongshun County

References

Hunan
 
Townships